Gyula Lázár (8 February 1911 – 27 February 1983) was a Hungarian footballer. He played for the Hungarian national team a total of 49 times between 1931 and 1941.

Lazar was in the Hungarian squad for both the 1934 and 1938 World Cups. He played one game in the 1934 tournament, but in 1938 he played in 4 games, including the final against Italy.

At the time of the 1938 tournament he was playing his club football with Ferencváros TC.

References

External links
 
 

1911 births
Hungarian footballers
Hungary international footballers
1934 FIFA World Cup players
1938 FIFA World Cup players
Ferencvárosi TC footballers
1983 deaths
People from Füzesgyarmat
Association football midfielders
Sportspeople from Békés County
Szentlőrinci SE footballers